Charles St. John  Fancourt (1804–1875) was an English Conservative politician who sat in the House of Commons from 1832 to 1837 and later a British colonial superintendent.

At the 1832 general election Fancourt was elected as a Member of Parliament (MP) for Barnstaple. He held the seat until 1837. Fancourt was Superintendent of British Honduras from 1843 to 1851.

Fancourt died at the age of 70.

References

External links

1804 births
1875 deaths
UK MPs 1832–1835
UK MPs 1835–1837
Conservative Party (UK) MPs for English constituencies
Governors of British Honduras
Members of the Parliament of the United Kingdom for Barnstaple